Thyron Lewis (born November 25, 1982) is an American football wide receiver for the Atlanta Havoc of the American Arena League (AAL). He played college football at Howard University and attended William H. Taft High School in Woodland Hills, California. He has also been a member of the Stockton Lightning, Tri-Cities Fever, Bossier–Shreveport Battle Wings and Los Angeles KISS. Lewis was also drafted by Team Tennessee in the supplemental 2008 AAFL Draft and by the Georgia Stallions in the 2009 UNGL Draft.

College career
Lewis recorded 30 receptions for 513 yards and four touchdowns for the Howard Bison from 2004 to 2005.

Professional career
Lewis began his professional career when he signed with the Washington Football Team(formerly Redskins) as an undrafted free agent in 2006. Lewis spent two seasons on the practice squad for Washington under the guidance and coaching of Hall of Fame head coach Joe Gibbs(2006-2008). Lewis was later released by Washington nearing the end of the 2008 season and was signed by the Seattle Seahawks for a brief stint, under multiple time Super Bowl winning coach Mike Holmgren. Nearing the end of 2008, Lewis decided to move to indoor football, joining the AFL’s developmental league af2. Lewis played for the Stockton Lightning of the af2 in 2008. He recorded 28 receptions for 384 yards and 6 touchdowns for the Lightning. Lewis was traded to the af2's Tri-Cities Fever for future considerations in May 2008. He spent the 2009 season with the Bossier–Shreveport Battle Wings of the af2. He played for the Tri-Cities Fever of the Indoor Football League (IFL) in 2010. Lewis recorded 50 receptions for 675 yards and 25 touchdowns in 13 games, earning second-team All-IFL honors. He was assigned to Cleveland Gladiators of the AFL on October 8, 2010. He recorded 97 receptions for a team-leading 1,430 yards and 26 touchdowns in 2013. On October 28, 2014, Lewis was assigned to the Los Angeles KISS. He was placed on recallable reassignment on May 27, 2015. On June 4, 2015, he was assigned to the Gladiators. On January 26, 2017, Lewis signed with the Jacksonville Sharks, who had moved to the National Arena League. He signed with the Atlanta Havoc of the American Arena League (AAL) in December 2017.   Lewis has experience on the defensive side of the ball as well, recording 36 tackles and 1 interception over his career. Along with his time as a returner, totaling 119 yards on 16 returns. Lewis also placed at number 47 among the #AFLTop50 of all-time arena football players.

Coaching career
Thyron Lewis began his coaching career in 2014 as a receivers coach and JV head coach for multiple high schools across America, including high schools; Orange County Morningside, Millikan, Lynwood Senior, and his most recent job as a coach for Allen D. Nease High School in Ponte Vedra Beach during the 2019 season. Lewis put a pause on his high school coaching career when he officially signed with Edward Waters College as a wide receivers coach on October 2nd, 2020. Thyron Lewis also serves as a personal trainer for young athletes in the Jacksonville area, being the founder and owner of Boomin' 3lite Sports Performance Training.

References

External links

Just Sports Stats
College stats
Arena Football League profile
EWC Coach
AFL Stats

Living people
1982 births
American football wide receivers
African-American players of American football
Howard Bison football players
Stockton Lightning players
Tri-Cities Fever players
Bossier–Shreveport Battle Wings players
Cleveland Gladiators players
Los Angeles Kiss players
Jacksonville Sharks players
American Arena League players
Players of American football from Los Angeles
People from Woodland Hills, Los Angeles
Westchester High School (Los Angeles) alumni